The Abu Dhabi Department of Education and Knowledge (ADEK), previously Abu Dhabi Education Council (ADEC) is the educational authority for the Emirate of Abu Dhabi, the largest emirate of the United Arab Emirates and the home of the country's capital city.

Organized in 2005 by the UAE's president Sheikh Khalifa bin Zayed Al Nahyan, the department is responsible primarily for the management and administration of the emirate's public schools. Additionally, it issues licenses, monitors, and inspects the emirate's many different private schools.  Since 2009, it has implemented its New School Model, a project to improve teaching standards in the emirate by increasing the quality of teaching, curriculum, and administration.  As part of the New School Model, the department has recruited thousands of licensed teachers from native English speaking countries, such as the United States, United Kingdom, Canada, Australia, New Zealand, and South Africa.

Organisation
Mohammed bin Zayed Al Nahyan is the sitting chairman. Below him is the Director General, Mugheer al Khalili, who has administered the department since 2005.

It governs public schools, private schools, and higher education in the Abu Dhabi emirate.  These three tiers are divided into three educational zones.  Abu Dhabi zone includes the capital city and the surrounding coastal areas, ending its authority near Al Khatim, halfway between Al Ain and Abu Dhabi, and the Dubai-Abu Dhabi border.  The Al Ain zone includes Al Ain city and all schools north of Al Ain until the Abu Dhabi emirate-Dubai border, all schools south of Al Ain to Saudi Arabia, and all schools west of Al Ain until Al Khatim on the Al Ain-Abu Dhabi road.  Finally, the Western Zone, known as al Gharbia, is the largest by territory but smallest by population.  It includes all schools in Abu Dhabi's western region, including some schools on outlying islands.

The public school system is divided into three cycles.  Cycle 1 is made up of grades 1-5, Cycle 2 of grade 6-9, and Cycle 3 of grades 10-12.  All public schools are segregated by sex, except in cycle one.  Curriculum from grades 1-9 is currently the New School Model.  The curriculum is implemented to varying degrees in Cycle 3, with the exception of grade 12, where students continue to be given examinations based on the federal Ministry of Education's requirements. As of 2013 the emirate had 265 public schools.

Private schools must abide by the department's governing rules and guidelines and are inspected once a year.  However, they may operate using any approved curriculum they choose, including the United States, Canada, Pakistan, France, and the United Kingdom. There are 185 private schools in the emirate.

Higher education in the emirate also falls under the department's authority.  There are 18 higher education institutions.

Criticism and controversy
In September 2012, apartments provided by the department suffered a courtyard collapse, rendering the site unsafe for several months.  Staff were evacuated to new accommodations.

Local newspapers routinely report high instances of cheating in public schools and universities under the department's supervision.  No program yet exists to address academic dishonesty.

Students are reported to have assaulted staff members, including teachers, without police action or administrative involvement from ADEK.

The government-owned English-language newspaper The National wrote about poor student behavior as a factor into why some newly arrived teachers left the country without completing their contracts.

Administrative competence in public schools is reported to be low, interfering routinely with school operations.

References

External links

 , the agency's official website

2005 establishments in the United Arab Emirates
Education in Abu Dhabi
Educational organisations based in the United Arab Emirates
Government agencies of Abu Dhabi
Government agencies established in 2005
Educational institutions established in 2005
Abu Dhabi